Ficus ventricosus, common name the swollen fig shell, is a species of sea snail, a marine gastropod mollusk in the family Ficidae, the fig shells.

Description
The adult shell size varies between 70 mm and 150 mm.

Distribution
This species is found in the Gulf of California off the coast of Mexico, and in the Pacific Ocean off Peru.

References

External links
 

Ficidae
Gastropods described in 1825